This page provides the summaries of the CAF First Round matches for the 2010 FIFA World Cup qualification and the 2010 African Cup of Nations.

Format 
Five knockout ties were originally required, involving the ten lowest ranked African countries (based on FIFA rankings as of July 2007). The actual draw was apparently conducted one day before the format was announced by CAF. The pairings were:

  v 
  v 
  v 
  v 
  v 

São Tomé and Príncipe and the Central African Republic both withdrew in early September. As a result, Swaziland and Seychelles (the highest ranked of the ten nations) were no longer required to play in this round, and the teams they were originally matched against, Somalia and Djibouti, were redrawn to play each other instead. The tie between Djibouti and Somalia was played as a one leg tie in Djibouti, as Somalia was not deemed suitable for FIFA matches; the other two ties were played as two leg ties.

The winners advanced to the Second Round.

Matches 

Madagascar won 10 – 2 on aggregate and advanced to the Second Round.

Djibouti advanced to the Second Round. This tie was played as a one leg tie in Djibouti, as Somalia was not deemed suitable for FIFA matches.

Sierra Leone won 1 – 0 on aggregate and advanced to the Second Round.

Goalscorers
There were 14 goals scored over 5 games, for an average of 2.80 goals per game.
4 goals
 Faneva Imà Andriantsima

2 goals

 Lalaina Nomenjanahary
 Rija Rakotomandimby

1 goals

 Bakar Ibor
 Daoud Midtadi
 Hussein Yassin
 Hubert Robson
 Jean Tsaralaza
 Kewullay Conteh

References 

1
Qual